WTYC may refer to:

 WTYC (FM), a defunct radio station (90.9 FM) formerly licensed to Marietta, Ohio, United States
 WAVO, a radio station (1150 AM) licensed to Rock Hill, South Carolina, United States, which formerly held the call sign WTYC